11-Hydroxy-Delta-8-tetrahydrocannabinol (11-OH-Δ8-THC, alternatively numbered as 7-OH-Δ6-THC), or often erroneously delta-11 is an active metabolite of Δ8-THC, a psychoactive cannabinoid found in small amounts in cannabis. It is an isomer of 11-OH-Δ9-THC, and is produced via the same metabolic pathway. It was the first cannabinoid metabolite discovered in 1970.

It retains psychoactive effects in animal studies with higher potency than Δ8-THC but lower potency than 11-OH-Δ9-THC. With widespread legal use of semi-synthetic Δ8-THC in jurisdictions where Δ9-THC remains illegal, 11-OH-Δ8-THC is now an important metabolite for distinguishing between use of legal Δ8-THC and illegal Δ9-THC.

See also 
 3'-Hydroxy-THC
 7-Hydroxycannabidiol
 8,11-Dihydroxytetrahydrocannabinol
 9-OH-HHC
 11-OH-HHC
 11-OH-CBN
 11-Nor-9-carboxy-THC
 Delta-6-Cannabidiol
 Delta-10-THC
 Delta-11-Tetrahydrocannabinol
 HU-210

Notes

References 

Cannabinoids
Benzochromenes